Base bleed is a system used on some artillery shells to increase range, typically by about 20–35%. It expels gas into the low pressure area behind the shell to reduce base drag (it does not produce thrust).

Since base bleed extends the range by a percentage, it is more useful on longer range artillery where an increase of approximately  can be achieved. Until the late 1980s the small gains in range were not considered worthwhile for field artillery. Base bleed shells are becoming more common in units equipped with modern artillery with far greater range than older guns, but are usually only used when the longer range is required, due to their higher cost.

Function 
Most (50–60%) of the drag on an artillery shell comes from the nose of the shell, as it pushes the air out of its way at supersonic speeds. Shaping the shell properly can reduce this drag.

However, another powerful source of drag is the low-pressure area left behind the shell due to its blunt base. Base bleed can reduce this drag without extending the base of the shell. Instead, a small ring of metal extends just past the base, and the area in the rear of the shell is filled with a small gas generator. The gas generator provides little to no thrust, but fills the vacuum in the area behind the shell with an inflow of gas, dramatically reducing drag. It was found that the reduced turbulence also gave the projectiles a more consistent trajectory, resulting in tighter grouping.
The only disadvantage, apart from higher cost, was a small loss in explosive payload in older shells due to some of the space inside the shell being taken up by this mechanism, but modern gas generators are smaller and are incorporated in the shell casing.

History
The principles were developed in Sweden in the mid-1960s by the Försvarets forskningsanstalt (abbreviated FOA) and the Artillery bureau at the Kungliga Materielförvaltningen (later the Försvarets Materielverk (FMV)) while working on a rocket-assisted projectile called "reatil". Their goal was to increase the range of coastal artillery. By 1966, it had been concluded that a small slow-burning charge at the base of the projectile would alleviate the low pressure behind the shell, hence increasing the range by lessening the difference between the pressure due to aerodynamic drag on the nose of the shell and the low pressure behind the base. The first full-scale tests took place in 1969 with modified 10.5 cm steel shells, with excellent results, and the Swedish patent was granted to FOA in 1971 although both application and patent were classified. Since the development was done, the patent was transferred to FMV for procurement to the armed forces of Sweden.

The concept was quickly implemented into the 7.5 cm sjömålsgranat m/66 (7.5 cm anti-ship shell m/66) used in the 7.5 cm tornpjäs m/57 fixed coastal artillery gun, and then rapidly into all anti-ship shells in the Swedish military.

Since FMV was to contract a company in the US to manufacture the gas generator for the 12 cm sjömålsgranat m/70 (12 cm anti-ship shell m/70), used in the 12 cm TAP m/70 fixed coastal artillery gun, the classification secret was removed from the patent. Shortly thereafter the international rights were sold, eventually ending up with the Space Research Corporation (SRC), then owned by aeronautical engineer Gerald Bull.

By the end of the 20th century, the technology was generally available world-wide.

See also

 
 Rocket Assisted Projectile (RAP)

References

  (in Swedish) 
 (in Swedish)

External links
 Army researchers add power, range to artillery Picatinny Arsenal

Artillery ammunition